A nuclear briefcase is a specially outfitted briefcase used to authorize the use of nuclear weapons and is usually kept near the leader of a nuclear weapons state at all times.

France
In France, the nuclear briefcase does not officially exist. A black briefcase called the "mobile base" follows the president in all his trips, but it is not specifically devoted to nuclear force.

India
India does not have a nuclear briefcase. In India, the Political Council of the Nuclear Command Authority (NCA) must collectively authorize the use of nuclear weapons. The NCA Executive Council gives its opinion to the Political Council, which authorises a nuclear attack when deemed necessary. While the Executive Council is chaired by the National Security Advisor (NSA), the Political Council is chaired by the Prime Minister. This mechanism was implemented to ensure that Indian nuclear weapons remain firmly in civilian control and that there exists a sophisticated command-and-control mechanism to prevent their accidental or unauthorised use.

The Prime Minister is often accompanied by Special Protection Group personnel carrying a black briefcase. It contains foldable Kevlar protection armor, essential documents and has a pocket that can hold a pistol.

Pakistan
On 11 April 2019, the BBC revealed footage of Prime Minister Imran Khan carrying a black briefcase that contains the codes to Pakistan's nuclear weapons.

Russia

Russia's "nuclear briefcase" is code-named Cheget. It "supports communication between senior government officials while they are making the decision whether to use nuclear weapons, and in its own turn is plugged into the special Kazbek communication system, which includes all the individuals and agencies involved in command and control of the Strategic Nuclear Forces." It is usually assumed, although not known with certainty, that the nuclear briefcases are also issued to the Minister of Defense and the Chief of General Staff of the Russian Federation.

United States

Contents

Operation

Briefcases in fiction
Cinema and literature have dealt with this subject several times.

Film and television
The Dead Zone (1983): Johnny Smith, while shaking the hand of US Senate candidate Greg Stillson during an electoral meeting, has the prophetic vision of Stillson as president of the United States launching a pre-emptive nuclear attack against Russia by scanning his palm on a computer terminal to authorize the missile launch.

The Peacekeeper (1997)
Deterrence (1999): Fictional US President Walter Emerson uses his nuclear briefcase to authorize a nuclear attack on the city of Baghdad, Iraq. A group of rogue veterans turned terrorist manages to steal the briefcase

24 (TV series) (2005): Terrorists get their hands on the nuclear briefcase and steal a page from the book containing activation codes and warhead locations.
Swing Vote (2008): The incumbent president attempts to impress a key voter by letting him hold the nuclear football.

Salt (2010): The US President reacts to Russia's threatening nuclear posture by deploying the briefcase and authenticating his identity; shortly afterwards, a Soviet sleeper agent kills the presidential security detail and uses the briefcase to issue nuclear attack orders.

Mission: Impossible – Ghost Protocol (2011)
G.I. Joe: Retaliation (2013)
White House Down (2013)
Scorpion (2015): In season one, episode 15, a team must return a nuclear football stolen sixteen years earlier during the course of a tactical operation. Pirates had already tried to launch a strike using an American nuclear silo based in Iceland, but failed.
The Fate of the Furious (2017)

Literature
Langelot et la Clef de la guerre, a children's spy novel by Vladimir Volkoff.
The key used to fire nuclear missiles is stolen from the President of France.

See also
Letters of last resort – (United Kingdom)

References

External links
Shattered Shield. Cold-War Doctrines Refuse to Die By David Hoffman, Washington Post, March 15, 1998

Military communications
Nuclear command and control
United Kingdom nuclear command and control
Cabinet Office (United Kingdom)